is a private junior college in Otofuke, Hokkaido, Japan, established in 1960.

External links
 Official website 

Educational institutions established in 1960
Private universities and colleges in Japan
Universities and colleges in Hokkaido
Japanese junior colleges
1960 establishments in Japan